Georges Vanbrabant (15 August 1926 – 9 January 2011) was a Belgian cyclist. He competed in the team pursuit event at the 1948 Summer Olympics.

References

External links
 

1926 births
2011 deaths
Belgian male cyclists
Olympic cyclists of Belgium
Cyclists at the 1948 Summer Olympics